The 1897 Boston College football team was an American football team that represented Boston College as an independent during the 1897 college football season. Led by first-year head coach John Dunlop, Boston College compiled a record of 4–3.

Schedule

References

Boston College
Boston College Eagles football seasons
Boston College football
19th century in Boston